"Serbi Serbi'''" is a single from Khaled's album N'ssi N'ssi. "Serbi Serbi" means "Pour me, pour me" in Khaled's native Arabic dialect.

 Track listings 
 Version 1 
"Serbi Serbi" (3:51)
"Kebou" (Remix) (4:56) Ethnic Mix''

Version 2 
"Serbi Serbi" (3:47)
"Kebou" (Ethnic Mix) (4:56)
"Ragda" (3:48)
"Didi" (Oasi Gimmick Version) (Radio Edit) (4:13)

External links 
 

1993 singles
Khaled (musician) songs
World music songs
Song recordings produced by Don Was
1992 songs